TallBoyz is a Canadian television sketch comedy troupe best known for their 2019-2022 CBC Television sketch comedy series.

The series stars Guled Abdi, Vance Banzo, Tim Blair and Franco Nguyen, who have worked for several years in stage-based sketch comedy under the name TallBoyz II Men. They were previously best known for their stage show A 6ix NNNNNN Revue, which won the award for Best Comedy at the 2018 Toronto Fringe Festival. The title of A 6ix NNNNNN Revue was an allusion to the Toronto alternative weekly newspaper Now, whose music, film, literature and theatre critics rate works on a scale of one to five N's instead of stars.

The series is produced by Bruce McCulloch and Susan Cavan, and was developed after McCulloch saw the troupe perform at the Toronto Sketch Comedy Festival in 2018.

In March 2022, the series began airing in the U.S on Fuse.

Tallboyz is the winner of four Canadian Screen Awards (CSAs) including Best Sketch Comedy Program or Series.

Episodes

Season 1

Season 2

Season 3

References

External links
 

2010s Canadian sketch comedy television series
2019 Canadian television series debuts
CBC Television original programming
2020s Canadian sketch comedy television series
2022 Canadian television series endings